Halam may refer to:

Halam (ethnic group), an ethnic group in India
Halam language, its language
Halam, Nottinghamshire, a village in England
people with the surname:
Ann Halam, a writer
Robert Halam (died 1417), an English medieval bishop and university chancellor

See also 
 Hallam (disambiguation)

Language and nationality disambiguation pages